Acerra is a town and comune of Campania, southern Italy, in the Metropolitan City of Naples, about  northeast of the capital in Naples. It is part of the Agro Acerrano plain.

History
Acerra is one of the most ancient cities of the region, probably founded by the Osci with the name of Akeru. It first appears in history as an independent city during the great war of the Campanians and Latins against Rome; shortly after the conclusion of which, in 332 BC, the Acerrani, in common with several other Campanian cities, obtained the Roman "civitas", but without the right of suffrage. The period at which this latter privilege was granted them is not mentioned, but it is certain that they ultimately obtained the full rights of Roman citizens.

In the Second Punic War it was faithful to the Roman alliance, on which account it was besieged by Hannibal in 216 BC, and being abandoned by the inhabitants in despair, was plundered and burnt. But after the expulsion of Hannibal from Campania, the Acerrani, with the consent of the Roman senate, returned to and rebuilt their city in 210 BC.

Acerra served as a Roman base during the Social War in 90 BC. During the Social War it was besieged by the Samnite general, Gaius Papius Mutilus, but offered so vigorous a resistance that he was unable to reduce it. Virgil praises the fertility of its territory, but the town itself had suffered so much from the frequent inundations of the river Clanius, on which it was situated, that it was in his time almost deserted. It subsequently received a colony under Augustus, and Strabo speaks of it in conjunction with Nola and Nuceria, apparently as a place of some consequence. It does not seem, however, to have retained its colonial rank, but is mentioned by Pliny as an ordinary municipal town.

In 826 the Lombards built here a castle, later destroyed by Bono of Naples. In 881 it was sacked by the Saracens. Later it was a Norman possession, the seat of a county. As part of the Kingdom of Naples, it was a fief of the Aquino, the Origlia, the Orsini del Balzo and, from 1496 until 1812, the Cardenas. From 1927 it was part of the province of Terra di Lavoro.

On 1 October 1943, several units of the Hermann Göring Division massacred nearly 90 civilians, including 7 children and 14 women in one of the bloodiest massacres in Campania; a memorial was erected to the victims.

Acerra is a suburb of Naples. In the 1990s to the 2000s, a waste management crisis broke out in the city as a result of illegal dumping by the Pellini brothers, Camorra members. Majority of the waste was dumped in the region between Acerra, Nola, and Marigliano, referred to as the "Triangle of Death". A 2004 study by Alfredo Mazza published in The Lancet Oncology revealed that deaths by cancer in the area are much higher than the European average. In 2009, the Acerra incineration facility was completed at a cost of over €350 million. The incinerator burns 600,000 tons of waste per year to produce refuse-derived fuel. The energy produced from the facility is enough to power 200,000 households per year.

Main sights
Acerra Cathedral, originally built over an ancient temple of Hercules and remade in the 19th century. It houses some Baroque canvasses from the 17th century. Annexed is the Bishop's Palace.
Church of Corpus Domini (16th century).
Church of Annunziata (15th century), with a 12th-century crucifix and a 15th-century Annunciation attributed to Dello Delli.
Church of San Pietro (16th-17th centuries)
Baronial Castle.
Archaeological area of Suessula. Location 40°59'23.47"N 14°23'53.41"E

References

External links
 Acerrae in William Smith's Dictionary of Greek and Roman Geography (1854).

Cities and towns in Campania
History of the Camorra in Italy
Castles in Italy
Osci
Italic archaeological sites